The Pan-Orthodox Council, officially referred to as the Holy and Great Council of the Orthodox Church (also sometimes called the Council of Crete), was a synod of set representative bishops of the universally recognised autocephalous local churches of the Eastern Orthodox Church held in Kolymvari, Crete. The Council sat from 19 to 26 June 2016.

Preparations

In March 2014, the Primates of local Orthodox Churches convened in Fener, the residence of the Ecumenical Patriarch Bartholomew I, and reached a decision: "The Holy and Great Council of the Orthodox Church will be convened by the Ecumenical Patriarch in Constantinople in 2016, unless something unexpected occurs."

In January 2016, at the invitation of the Ecumenical Patriarch Bartholomew, the Synaxis of Primates of the Orthodox Autocephalous Churches was held at the Orthodox Center of the Ecumenical Patriarchate in Chambésy, Switzerland. The Primates of the local Orthodox Churches and three official delegations representing the Church of Antioch, the Church of Greece, and the Church of Poland, convened to finalise the texts for the Holy and Great Council. Due to the heightened tensions between Russia and Turkey, a decision was reached to hold the Synod in Greece.

Agenda, decisions and reception
 
The items officially approved at the 2016 Synaxis for referral to and adoption by the Holy and Great Council were:
 The Mission of the Orthodox Church in Today's World; 
 The Orthodox Diaspora; 
 Autonomy and the Means by Which it is Proclaimed; 
 The Sacrament of Marriage and its Impediments; 
 The Importance of Fasting and Its Observance Today; 
 Relations of the Orthodox Church with the Rest of the Christian World.

Elizabeth Prodromou, an American professor who was on the team advising Patriarch Bartholomew at the Council, stated that the Council would enable the Orthodox church to express a "robust theology of global engagement".

The Council in Crete approved, with minor amendments, the documents that had been elaborated by all the Churches in the course of their consultations prior to the Synod, and adopted the Message and the Encyclical.

In view of non-attendance by the four Churches, the Synod's official spokesman Archbishop Job Getcha stated that all the documents adopted by the Council in Crete would be binding to all the Orthodox Churches.

On 27 June 2016, the Synod of the Church of Antioch issued a statement concerning the Crete Council that stated that the documents adopted by in Crete were not binding for the Patriarchate of Antioch; the Church of Antioch recognized the Synod as "a preliminary gathering on the way to a Pan-Orthodox Council", while the documents it adopted as not final and open for discussion.

The Synod of the Russian Church (the Moscow Patriarchate) in July 2016 passed a resolution that designated the Crete Council as "an important event in the history of the synodal process in the Orthodox Church that was begun by the First Pan-Orthodox consultation in Rhodes in 1961", but the Russian Church Synod refused to recognise the Synod as pan-orthodox and the documents thereof as "reflecting pan-orthodox consensus". The Russian Church Synod decided to have the Crete Synod's documents examined for further conclusions. In early December 2017, the Bishops′ Council of the ROC approved the previous resolution of the ROC Synod that stated that the ROC did not recognise the Council in Crete as Pan-Orthodox, nor its decisions binding for all the Orthodox Churches.

On 18 November 2016, Ecumenical Patriarch Bartholomew I of Constantinople sent a letter to the Archbishop of Athens asking him to admonish some of the Greek Orthodox clergy who reject the Holy and Great Council. According to the document, Patriarch Bartholomew reserved to himself the right to sever ecclesiastical and sacramental communion with those clergymen if Greek ecclesiastical authorities decide not to act on the patriarch's request to discipline them. As Dr. Ines Murzaku, professor of Ecclesiastical History and Founding Chair of the Department of Catholic Studies at Seton Hall University, elaborated in her email interview to Crisis Magazine, such "interference and pressure to excommunicate might sound more as rules/jurisdiction that apply in the West“, and for this reason the Patriarch Bartholomew "might be viewed by many as ‘the Pope of the East’ or ‘Orthodox Pope’”.

However, other Catholic scholars such as Ludwig Hertling, would disagree as he says in his book, Communio: Church and Papacy in Early Christianity, anyone could and did break communion when the parties felt necessary. The most prominent example is the excommunications between Patriarch Michael Kerularios and Cardinal Humbert (a representative of Pope Leo, but not Leo himself) when the latter excommunicated the former. That is still practiced in the Church today.
The Patriarch's request for admonishment concerning the clerics in question is not based on their rejection of the Council per se, since others also disagree, but with the manner they conduct their activities as well as their allegations and charges, including that of heresy (both type of actions denounced by the Holy Synods of other autocephalous Churches).

Participants and delegations

Churches that attended

Churches that did not attend

Church of Antioch
The Antiochian Church pulled out due to the dispute over the ecclesiastical jurisdiction of Qatar that is also claimed by the Patriarchate of Jerusalem.

The Antiochian Church joined the Church of Georgia in their reservations toward the pre-conciliar document about marriage, and also disagreed with the document about the Orthodox diaspora. There were other matters which the Antiochian Church desired to discuss, such as the calendar issue, but had been removed from the agenda due to lack of consensus on the issue.

Still desiring to convene a Pan-Orthodox Council with full participation, the Antiochian Church considers the 2016 meeting to be "a preliminary meeting towards the Pan-Orthodox Council, [and thus considers] its documents not final, but still open to discussion and amendment upon the convocation of the Great Pan-Orthodox Council in the presence and participation of all the Autocephalous Orthodox Churches."

Russian Church 
The Russian Orthodox Church pulled out because of her belief that the council is not truly "pan-orthodox" without the Antiochan, Bulgarian, or Georgian churches. Previously, a preliminary discussion was held on the composition of the delegation to the Pan-Orthodox Council, and the list of participants was published.

In 2007 the Moscow and Constantinople patriarchates disagreed at the Joint International Commission for Theological Dialogue Between the Catholic Church and the Orthodox Church over the issue of the Eastern Orthodoxy in Estonia. Metropolitan Stephanos, the primate of the Constantinople-backed Estonian church attended with the Ecumenical Patriarch's Constantinopolitan delegation; Metropolitan Cornelius of the Russia-backed Estonian Church was not listed among the prospective Russian delegation.

Church of Bulgaria
The Bulgarian Orthodox Church pulled out due to disagreements on some of the texts already approved for the Synod meeting, and specifically that those texts would not be subject to editing in the course of discussions, though that seemed to be a misunderstanding, since all documents were opened for discussion and other Churches went ready to and did amend them.

Church of Georgia
The Georgian Orthodox Church pulled out due to disagreements about several of the Synod's documents, in particular "The Relation of the Orthodox Church with the Rest of the Christian World".

In December 2016 the holy synod of the Church of Georgia rejected the claim that the council, which it refers to as the "Council of Crete", was Pan Orthodox and the idea that its texts reflected Orthodox Teaching.

Orthodox Church in America

The Orthodox Church in America (OCA) was not invited due to the lack of recognition of her autocephaly by some other autocephalous Churches. However, the jurisdiction did support the Council and its convocation by sending clergy scholars from among them to help with the event before, during, and after. In addition, she released an official letter in support of the Council and a special prayer to be included during every Divine Liturgy in every diocese. Also, OCA scholars were among the drafters of a special letter sent to every autocephalous Church urging them to support the convocation of the Council during the time when critical voices were pressuring certain Churches to not attend the synod just a few days before it was to meet. However, the OCA has not released a post-Council statement, and Metropolitan Tikhon has been in the process of resuming the discussion between the OCA and the Ecumenical Patriarchate.

Notes

References

External links

 Official Website Of The Great And Holy Council.
 Comprehensive Information On The Great And Holy Council From The Ecumenical Patriarchate Featuring Information, News, Commentaries, And History Of The Council Under The Heading "Road To The Council".
 Ecumenical Patriarchate Press Office | Holy and Great Council of the Orthodox Church. The Ecumenical Patriarchate of Constantinople, 2016.
  Facebook Open Forum Dedicated to Information About the Council, Discussions, and The Future of Councils of the Orthodox Church Run By and With Participation of Clergy, Scholars, and Regular Laymen.'''
 Fr. Alexander Rentel On The Meaning Of Consensus.
 Sister Vassa Can Non-Orthodox Be Called "Churches"?.
 George Demacopoulos Innovation in the Guise of Tradition Anti Ecumenist Efforts to Derail the Great and Holy Council.
 Paul Gavrilyuk: Orthodox Council Bridges Tensions Moves Toward Interfaith Dialogue.
 Fr. Cyril Hovorun: A Blessedly Unpredictable Council.
 St Vladimir's Orthodox Seminary 33Rd Annual Fr Alexander Schmemann Lecture Featuring Information On The Great And Holy Council.
 Patriarch Of Alexandria Calls All To The Council.
 Orthodox Autocephalous Church Of Albania On The Great And Holy Council.
 Bishop Maxim Why We Should Go To The Council In Crete.
 Patriarch Of Romania About The Holy And Great Council.
 Many Questions Simple Answers By Archdeacon John Chryssavgis.
 Open Letter Of Georgian Theologians To The Holy Synod Of Orthodox Church Of Georgia Support The Holy And Great Council.
 Holy Cross Greek Orthodox School Of Theology Statement On The Great And Holy Council.
 International, Multilingual Blog On The Great And Holy Council. 
 Message from His All-Holiness on the Holy and Great Council - Ecumenical Patriarchate Press Office. His All-Holiness Ecumenical Patriarch Bartholomew (YouTube). May 13, 2016.
 Archdeacon and Ecumenical Patriarchate spokesman John Chryssavgis. On the Great Council of the Orthodox Church. First Things. Feb. 3, 2016.

Criticism
  The Holy And Great Council: Discussion. Orthodox Christianity (Pravoslavie.ru). (pathfinder to numerous articles mostly against the Council )
 Patriarch Kirill: We Do Not Call The Forthcoming Pan-Orthodox Council Ecumenical. 
 Session Of The Holy Synod Of The Russian Orthodox Church 3 June 2016, Proceedings No. 35. 
 Orthodox Church Of Cyprus Has Proposed Amendments To The Text "Relations Of The Orthodox Church With The Rest Of The Christian World". 
 Statement of the Secretariat of the Antiochian Holy Synod. 
 Conclusions Of The Theological-Academic Conference: The Holy And Great Council: With Great Preparation But Without Expectations. Transl. Fr. Nicholas K. Orthodox Christianity (Pravoslavie.ru). June 4, 2016.
 A Statement Issued by the Secretariat of the Holy Synod of Antioch, Balamand, June 1, 2016. Greek Orthodox Patriarchate of Antioch and All the East. 2016-06-02.
 Fr. Peter Alban Heers. From the Second Vatican Council (1965) to the Pan-Orthodox Council (2016): Signposts on the Way to Crete. 
 Bulgarian Orthodox Church: Outside The Orthodox Church "There Are No Other Churches, Only Heresies And Schisms".
 Communication of the Holy Synod of the Russian Orthodox Church Outside of Russia to the Clerics and Faithful. 
 Metropolitan Of New Smyrna: "It Cannot Be Considered A Pan-Orthodox Council In Which Not Every Bishop Participates". 
 Video: Georgian Orthodox Church Rejects Document On Ecumenism Drafted For The Great Council, 2016. 
 Met. Hierotheos Vlachos. Letter To The Holy Synod Of Greece Concerning Preparations For The Upcoming Great And Holy Council.
 Metropolitan Of Limassol: "What Unity Are We Talking About? Those Who Departed From The Church Are Heretics And Schismatics".
 Dimitrios Tselingidis Observations on the Text of the Upcoming Council.

Eastern Orthodox Church councils
2016 in Greece
21st-century church councils